Ukrainian rock is rock music from Ukraine.

While it is rock it is important for those who follow Ukrainian contemporary music to understand the VIA music scene of the 1970s and 1980s. This controlled form of music, was a response to the Rock and roll infiltrating from the outside of the Ukrainian Soviet Socialist Republic, to understand the development of Ukrainian rock one has to understand its background.

The most popular bands include BoomBox, Braty Hadiukiny, Druha Rika, Haydamaky, Komu Vnyz, Lama, Mad Heads XL, Mandry, Mertvyi Piven, Okean Elzy, Plach Yeremiyi, S.K.A.Y., Taras Petrynenko, Tartak, TNMK, Viy, Vopli Vidoplyasova and others. Opalnyi Prynz was, perhaps, the most influential rock band in the late 1980s and early 1990s, followed by its predecessor Loony Pelen. Okean Elzy, featuring Svyatoslav Vakarchuk has long been among the most popular bands of Ukrainian pop-rock, and has had some success abroad.  The band Mandry is known for fusing traditional Ukrainian music with rock, blues, reggae and chansons. The pop-singer Ruslana also uses some elements of rock in her work.

The Chervona Ruta was a very important Ukrainian rock music festival.

"Пісенний Вернісаж" - New Ukrainian Wave 92 - 
Festival of the best Ukrainian folk/pop/rock bands (Producer- Rostyslav-show, 1992)

Famous Ukrainian heavy metal bands include Fleshgore, Firelake, Nokturnal Mortum, Astrofaes, Drudkh, and Hate Forest.

Metal Heads Mission is the biggest metal festival in Ukraine and ex-USSR countries.

History

1960s-1970s
Such bands as Eney and Hutsuly were created in the 1960s during Khrushchev Thaw.

Eney was the Ukrainian rock band that performed its own repertoire. It was named after the famous character, Aeneas, from one of the literary work of Ivan Kotlyarevsky.

During the 1960s students from a special music school in Kyiv formed this group. The group was named after Mykola Lysenko. They initially played unique interpretations of Ukrainian folk songs. Later, after members were exposed to  the late works of The Beatles, they started to rearrange works of Bach and Khachaturian. In 1971 the band split as Petrynenko and Blinov left it to form the new group Dzvony. The band started to experiment in new genres: blues and soul. In 1972 the band and their music were banned in the Soviet Union and labeled "bourgeois-national". As a result, all existing records/recordings were destroyed. After that the band went underground until 1974. The members then merged with Dzvony into the new vocal-instrumental ensemble Decorative Trails. After the group was accepted to the Ukr-kontsert it changed its name to Hrono. In 1977 the ensemble became Eney once again. After a period of time, the group broke up and members either joined different bands or went solo. Petrynenko later created his own group Hrono.

1980s
The rise of rock music in the middle of 1980s was inspired by Gorbachevs perestroika with its doctrinals of glasnost and uskoreniye.

Several rock bands were formed in the rock club "Kuznia", in Kyiv. Among them are Adem (1985), Vopli Vidopliasova (1986), Komu Vnyz (1988).

The most prominent event was Chervona Ruta music festival held for the first time in Chernivtsi in 1989.

Such bands as Braty Hadiukiny, Mertvyi Piven, Opalnyi Prynz, Skriabin and Sestry Telniuk were formed in the late 1980s

Braty Hadiukiny is a rock band from Lviv, one of the most successful Ukrainian bands of Soviet times. The band music style combines different genres such as rock'n'roll, blues, punk, reggae, funk and folk. Ironical song lyrics contain a lot of local vernacularisms, slang and surzhyk. The name translates as "Hadyukin Brothers", where the fictional surname Hadyukin is derived from the word hadiuka, or "viper". The abbreviation literally means "snakes" (In Ukrainian the two words are cognates.)

The band was active mainly between 1988 and 1996. In January 2006 they held a big solo concert in Kyiv which was a big event in Ukrainian media space and was visited by lot of famous people (including that time prime minister Yulia Tymoshenko). After band's leader Serhiy Kuzminskyi died in 2009 the big tribute concert was held in 2011, joined by prominent Ukrainian rock musicians such as Komu Vnyz, Vopli Vidoplyasova, Okean Elzy and others. In 2014 rest of band members released a new album (the first one since 1996).

Mertvyi Piven is a rock band that formed in 1989. The first concert was given in 1990 at the first Vyvykh festival. Their debut album Eto recorded in 1991, at the end of the Chervona Ruta festival (Chervona Ruta), where the group took first prize in the category of performers art songs. Dead Rooster began as an acoustic band. During the second half of the 1990s, they evolved into a grunge/art-rock band, though their music can't be described by one particular style. Dead Rooster has changed personnel several times.

Many songs of the band were written in lyrics of Ukrainian poets like Yuri Andrukhovych, Maksym Rylsky, Oleksandr Irvanets, Viktor Neborak, Yurko Pozayak, Serhiy Zhadan, Natalka Bilotserkivets, Ihor Kalynets and Taras Shevchenko. The album Pisni Mertvoho Pivnya is based on the Andrukhovych's poetry collection of the same name.

In 2009 their song "Kiss" ("Potsilunok") was featured in the a soundtrack of Cold Souls, an American film directed by Sophie Barthes.

Vopli Vidopliasova was formed in 1986 in Kyiv. Their influences include folk, patriotic songs, punk, hard rock, heavy metal and, most recently, electronic music.

Their song Den Narodzhennia is featured in the Russian crime films Brother and Brother 2 by director Aleksei Balabanov. Band member Oleh Skrypka has also produced several solo albums.

Komu Vnyz was founded in 1988 in Kyiv. They wound up at their first festival Chervona Ruta completely by chance. It was too late to submit the sample recording to the panel of judges for the tryout, but Taras Petrynenko, after listening to their work, insisted that they participated in the event.

As of 2011, Komu Vnyz is translating their lyrics into English in order to re-release their albums in Europe.

Early 1990s

Haydamaky is a folk rock band formed in Kyiv in 1991. The music of Haydamaky is inspired by various ethnic music from around the world, especially from various regions of Ukraine, such as Polesia, Bukovina, and Transcarpathia. Other influences include the Romanian folklore, punk music sound of Shane MacGowan and by the reggae of such bands like Burning Spear and Black Uhuru.

Haydamaky have recently performed at many club venues across Europe, including as a special guest at a concert of Asian Dub Foundation in Bratislava, Slovakia. Other club appearances this year were held in Germany, Estonia, Poland, Czech Republic, Slovakia, and Moscow.

Okean Elzy (translation: Elza's Ocean) is one of the most successful and popular Ukrainian bands. It was formed in 1994 in Lviv, Ukraine. The band's vocalist and frontman is Svyatoslav Vakarchuk. Okean Elzy is one of the best-loved Ukrainian rock band not only in Ukraine but also in most CIS countries. In April 2007 Okean Elzy received FUZZ Magazine music awards for “Best rock act”.

Plach Yeremiyi is a rock band from Lviv, Ukraine. The band was actually formed in February 1990, but the two most constant musicians - Taras Chubay and Vsevolod Dyachyshyn have played together since 1984 in the band Tsyklon (Циклон).

Plach Yeremiyi songs are usually serious, philosophical poems many composed by lead man Taras Chubay's father Hryhoriy Chubay and given a contemporary rock sound. The group's name comes from Taras Chubay's father's Magnum opus Plach Yeremiyi posthumously published in 1999.  The music in the songs sounds hard, then changes to an easy ballad and again explodes, overfilled by emotions. All this has a specific "Lviv" colouring.

Late 1990s

Dymna Sumish was founded on 3 December 1998 in Chernihiv. The group plays a mix of hardcore, punk and psychedelic rock. Winners of the festivals «Chervona Ruta» (Ukraine), «Pearls of the Season» (Ukraine), «Boards» (Moscow), «Woodstock» (Poland). Its name means Smoking Mix.

All members of the group are vegetarians. They openly express their opinion against violence, drugs and alcohol, trying to convey to the listeners with their music and lyrics the value of life.

In April 2012 the participants of the group said that the group temporarily stop their activity because of inability to cope with the situation in Ukraine - when a culture isn't valued, but instead all the power has policy, social experiments and  "totalitarianism".

Druha Rika is a rock band from Zhytomyr. The band's style determined as Brit Pop. Druha Rika released five studio albums and two compilations. The name of the band means Second river.

Tartak is a popular hip-hop/rapcore/alternative crossover band from Ukraine.  They mix styles of guitar rock, hip-hop and dance music to produce an energetic compositions and lyrics.

"Tartak" means woodsaw in Ukrainian. Sashko thought that tartak symbolized something energetic, loud, active, and hence appropriate for a band name.

Sashko Polozhynskyi founded the group in the Fall of 1996 in Lutsk, Ukraine. The group has released five albums with a total of 74 songs and 9 videos. Tartak's songs "Ni Ya Ne Tu Kokhav" and "Stilnykove Kohannia" stayed on the Top 40 charts for 144 days and 75 days respectively.  Tartak was one of the bands that performed during the events of the Orange Revolution as seen in the adjacent picture.

The true founder of Tartak was Vasyl Zinkevytch jr., a friend of Sashko. Bohdan Zinkevych came up with the name. Vasyl came up with the idea and put together the group; he also arranged the rehearsals since his father is a famous singer he has access to studios, so they could make records. At the beginning they were struggling because their lyrics weren't a success and the soloist (Vasyl Zinkevych) had no voice for lyrics they wrote. Sashko soon made changes because for a long time he was trying to make a place for himself in the show business. In the late 1990s Sashko was making his way as a showman on the concerts, parades, and other musical events! when his fame actually came to him he claimed that the idea of Tartak was his idea.

Tin Sontsia (sometimes literal translation Sun Shadow is used) is a folk metal band from Kyiv. Primarily the band's style was close to alternative rock, but in 2003 they have come to so called Cossack rock. Almost all of the lyrics are in Ukrainian except couple of Belarusian songs.

The band has taken part in number of festivals the biggest of which are Basovišča and Zakhid.

2000s–2010s
BoomBox (also: БумБокс, Bumboks) is a Ukrainian funky groove band, which was founded in 2004 by singer Andriy Khlyvniuk and  Andriy “Mukha” Samoilo on guitar. In April 2005 the band released its first album, which only took 19 hours to record.

Their songs are in predominantly in Ukrainian, but songs in Russian and English also appear on their albums and singles.

S.K.A.Y. is a pop rock band formed in 2001 in Ternopil, Ukraine.

After the band had been formed in 2001 it started to tour the country and performed at several festivals like Perlyny sezonu, Tavriyski ihry and Chervona ruta. They became more known for a broader audience after their appearance on the programme "Fresh Blood" on the Ukrainian TV channel M1. The general director Eduard Klim from Lavina Music saw them and signed them to his label.

In 2006 their first album "Te, shcho treba" was released. They released their second album "Planeta S.K.A.Y." already in 2007.

The frontman Oleh Sobchuk in 2008 was awarded the medal of the Ukrainian Orthodox Church (Moscow Patriarchate) "1020 Years of Baptism of Rus" for his participation in the rock-tour with the same name.

In October–November 2013 the group took part in agitational concerts "We are united", which were organized by pro-Russian politician Viktor Medvedchuk in Ukrainian cities.

Notable festivals
 Bandershtat (Volyn Oblast, 2007–present)
 Chervona Ruta (different cities of Ukraine, 1989–present)
 Taras Bulba (Dubno, Rivne Oblast, 1991–present)
 Tavria Games (Kakhovka, Kherson Oblast, 1992–present)
 Rock-Existence (Kyiv, 1996–2005)
 Rock-Sich (Kyiv, 2006–2013)
 Stare Misto (Lviv, 2007–2013)
 Trypilske kolo (Rzhyshchiv, Kyiv Oblast, 2008–present)
 Zakhid (Lviv Oblast, 2009–present)
 Respublica (Kamianets-Podilskyi, Khmelnytskyi Oblast, 2011–present)

List of notable Ukrainian rock bands

Art rock
 Eney
 Gorgisheli
 The Telniuk Sisters
 Plach Yeremiyi
 Mertvyi Piven

Black metal
 Astrofaes 
 Blood of Kingu 
 Drudkh 
 Hate Forest 
 Khors 
 Nokturnal Mortum

Death metal
 Firelake
 Fleshgore

Indie rock
 Brunettes Shoot Blondes
 Esthetic Education
 Marakesh
 Valentyn Strykalo

Folk metal
 Holy Blood
 Kroda
 Motanka
 Tin Sontsia

Folk rock
 KOZAK SYSTEM
 Los Colorados
 Haydamaky
 Mandry
 PanKe Shava
 TIK
 Vopli Vidopliasova (VV)
 Yurcash

Gothic metal
 Obiymy Doshchu

Gothic rock
 Komu Vnyz
 Viy

Heavy Metal
 Conquest
 Monolit
 Exact Division
 KPP
 Kryliya
 JackRebel
 Bila Vezha

Metalcore
 JetRockers
 Jinjer
 Make Me Famous
 MY RENAISSANCE

Pop rock
 BoomBox
 Druha Rika
 Krykhitka (ex-Krykhitka Tsakhes) 
 Lama
 Okean Elzy
 Opalnyi Prynz
 S.K.A.Y.
 Skriabin
 Trystavisim

Punk rock
 Braty Hadiukiny
 Dymna Sumish
 Flit
 Mad Heads XL (ex-Mad Heads)
 O.Torvald
 Perkalaba
 Qarpa (ex-Faktychno Sami)
 Robots Don't Cry
 Sobaky v Kosmosi
 Teoriia Gvaltu

Rap rock
 Tartak
 TNMK

List of rock bands Outside Ukraine
 The Ukes (Leeds, England)
 The Ukrainians (Leeds, England)
 Klooch (Toronto, Ontario, Canada)
 Enej (Olsztyn, Poland)
 Berkut (Olsztyn, Poland)
 Svoboda (Saint Petersburg, Russia)
 Sontse-Khmary (Saint Petersburg, Russia)

See also 
 Ukrainian metal

References

Rock music by country
Rock
Ukrainian rock music groups